The Sethi model was developed by Suresh P. Sethi and describes the process of how sales evolve over time in response to advertising. The model assumes that the rate of change in sales depend on three effects: response to advertising that acts positively on the unsold portion of the market, the loss due to forgetting or possibly due to competitive factors that act negatively on the sold portion of the market, and a random effect that can go either way.

Suresh Sethi published his paper "Deterministic and Stochastic Optimization of a Dynamic Advertising Model" in 1983. The Sethi model is a modification as well as a stochastic extension of  the Vidale-Wolfe advertising model. The model and its competitive and multi-echelon channel extensions have been used extensively in the literature.
Moreover, some of these extensions have been also tested empirically.<ref name="CV92"

Model

The Sethi advertising model or simply the Sethi model provides a sales-advertising dynamics in the form of the following stochastic differential equation:

 .

Where:
   is the market share at  time 
   is the rate of advertising at time 
   is the coefficient of the effectiveness of advertising
   is the decay constant
   is the diffusion coefficient
   is the Wiener process (Standard Brownian motion);  is known as White noise.

Explanation

The rate of change in sales depend on three effects: response to advertising that acts positively on the unsold portion of the market via , the loss due to forgetting or possibly due to competitive factors that act negatively on the sold portion of the market via , and a random effect using a diffusion or White noise term that can go either way.

  The coefficient  is the coefficient of the effectiveness of advertising innovation.
  The coefficient  is the decay constant.
  The square-root term brings in the so-called word-of-mouth effect at least at low sales levels.
  The diffusion term  brings in the random effect.

Example of an optimal advertising problem

Subject to the Sethi model above with the initial market share , consider the following objective function:

 

where  denotes the sales revenue corresponding to the total market, i.e., when , and  denotes the discount rate.

The function  is known as the value function for this problem, and it is shown to be

 

where

 

The optimal control for this problem is

 

where

 

and

Extensions of the Sethi model

 Competitive Model:Nash differential games
 Multi-echelon Model
  Empirical testing of the Sethi model and extensions
 Cooperative advertising: Stackelberg differential games 
 The Sethi durable goods model

See also

  Bass diffusion model
  differential games
  Stochastic differential equation
  Diffusion of innovations
  Stackleberg competition
  Nash equilibrium

References

Advertising
Mathematical economics
Optimal control
Stochastic models